George Henry Bredlinger (October 10, 1927 – August 21, 1986) was an American film and television actor. He was known for his starring role of Weasel Martin in the 1957 film Young and Dangerous.

Brenlin was born in Pitcairn, Pennsylvania. He appeared in episodes of the western television series The Deputy and the legal drama television series Perry Mason. In 1956, he played a lead role in the Broadway play Pictures in the Hallway. Brenlin guest-starred in television programs including Gunsmoke, Bonanza, 12 O'Clock High, The Fugitive, Rawhide, Adam-12 (4 episodes), Columbo, Tales of Wells Fargo and The Californians.

Partial filmography 

 The Proud and Profane (1956) - Casualty (uncredited)
 Young and Dangerous (1957) - Weasel Martin
 Riot in Juvenile Prison (1959) - Matches (uncredited)
 Cimarron (1960) - Hoss Barry
 Inside Moves (1980) - Gil

References

External links 

Rotten Tomatoes profile

1927 births
1986 deaths
People from Pitcairn, Pennsylvania
Male actors from Pennsylvania
American male film actors
American male television actors
20th-century American male actors